Wellman Morrison (1815-1857) was an artist in Boston, Massachusetts, in the mid-19th century. He painted landscapes and portraits; subjects included Charles Sumner. "He exhibited at the Boston Athenaeum in 1846, 1847, and 1856." Around 1852 he kept a studio in Boston's Tremont Temple.

References

Further reading

 Morrison, Leonard A.  Genealogy of the Morrison Family, 1880.

1815 births
1857 deaths
Artists from Boston
19th century in Boston
19th-century American painters
American male painters
19th-century American male artists